Saidur Rahman is a computer scientist, graph theorist, and professor at Bangladesh University of Engineering and Technology.

He is an author of the book Planar Graph Drawing. He is known for his contribution in graph drawing, graph algorithms, computational geometry, and several other branches of theoretical computer science. Together with his student Md. Iqbal Hossain he defined an interesting structure of spanning trees in embedded planar graphs called good spanning trees.

Education 
Rahman completed his Ph.D. on graph drawing algorithms under the supervision of Dr. Takao Nishizeki of Tohoku University, Japan in 1999. He also worked as a JSPS postdoctoral fellow and as an associate professor in Tohoku University during the period 2001–2004. He completed his master's degree in Engineering from Bangladesh University of Engineering and Technology, Bangladesh, in 1992.

Career 
Rahman joined  Bangladesh University of Engineering and Technology  in 1991. After receiving his PhD, he returned to BUET in 2004, and formed a research group consisting of undergraduate and graduate students in its Department of Computer Science and Engineering, Bangladesh University of Engineering and Technology], in 2005.  Since then he is doing research on various areas of graph algorithms and applications.
    
Together with Dr. Takao Nishizeki, Rahman wrote a graduate textbook   Planar Graph Drawing, which was published by World Scientific in 2004. He also wrote an undergraduate textbook   Basic Graph Theory    published by Springer in 2017.

WALCOM 
In 2007, with the support from Bangladesh Academy of Sciences (BAS), Rahman played the leading role in initiating and establishing the  International Workshop on Algorithms and Computation (WALCOM).

Awards and honors 
He was recognized as a fellow of Bangladesh Academy of Sciences (BAS) in a comparatively young age. He has received an Information Technology Award   2004 for his   contributions in Graph Drawing Algorithms.  Rahman has also received  Bangladesh Academy of Sciences (BAS) Gold Medal 2003 in the junior group, and University Grants Commission  Award 2004.

Selected publications 

 Books

 .
 .

 Research articles

 .
 .
 .
 .
 Md. Iqbal Hossain, Md. Saidur Rahman: "Good spanning trees in graph drawing". Theor. Comput. Sci. 607: 149-165 (2015)
 Shaheena Sultana, Md. Iqbal Hossain, Md. Saidur Rahman, Nazmun Nessa Moon, Tahsina Hashem: On triangle cover contact graphs. Comput. Geom. 69: 31-38 (2018)
 Rahnuma Islam Nishat, Debajyoti Mondal, Md. Saidur Rahman: Point-set embeddings of plane 3-trees. Comput. Geom. 45(3): 88-98 (2012)
 Debajyoti Mondal, Rahnuma Islam Nishat, Md. Saidur Rahman, Sue Whitesides: Acyclic coloring with few division vertices. J. Discrete Algorithms 23: 42-53 (2013)

References 

 1979 births
Living people
Academic staff of Bangladesh University of Engineering and Technology
Bangladeshi computer scientists
Graph drawing people
Graph theorists